Georg Witt (14 January 1899 – 17 April 1973) was a Russian-born German film producer. Born in Moscow he moved to Germany at a young age. He produced around forty films, including the 1955 Liselotte Pulver comedy I Often Think of Piroschka. He was the second husband of the actress Lil Dagover.

Selected filmography
 The Adjutant of the Czar (1929)
 Favorite of Schonbrunn (1929)
 The Ring of the Empress (1930)
 The Private Secretary (1931)
 The Typist (1931)
 Thea Roland (1932)
 The Sun Rises (1934)
 Land of Love (1937)
 The Mystery of Betty Bonn (1938)
 The Deruga Case (1938)
 Triad (1938)
 Between the Parents (1938)
 Detours to Happiness (1939)
 Congo Express (1939)
 Tonelli (1943)
 Orient Express (1944)
 The Blue Straw Hat (1949)
 Chased by the Devil (1950)
 I Often Think of Piroschka (1955)
 My Husband's Getting Married Today (1956)
 Salzburg Stories (1957)
 The Spessart Inn (1958)
 The Angel Who Pawned Her Harp (1959)
 The Haunted Castle (1960)

References

Bibliography 
 Goble, Alan. The Complete Index to Literary Sources in Film. Walter de Gruyter, 1999.

External links 
 

1899 births
1973 deaths
German film producers
Emigrants from the Russian Empire to Germany